Rahul Kaswan is an Indian politician, who first became a Member of parliament (MP) from Churu parliamentary constituency as a candidate of ruling Bharatiya Janata Party (BJP) party in Sixteenth Lok Sabha in 2014 Indian general election, and then again in 2019 Indian general election in the Seventeenth Lok Sabha .

Personal life 

He is a son of four time former MP, Ram Singh Kaswan, and grandson of former MP, Deep Chand Kaswan. His mother Kamala Kaswan too has been a MLA from the region. His ancestors had migrated to Kalri village of Churu district in Rajasthan from Matani village of Bhiwani district in Haryana.

Career 

He became a first-timer after a big win in the 2014 Lok Sabha elections when became the youngest MP from Rajasthan. He won with a record margin of 294,739 votes, the highest ever in the Churu constituency, thereby getting the rank of 6th highest margin winner, out of 25 seats in Rajasthan. He was pitted against Congress' first-timer Pratap Punia in the Churu Lok Sabha constituency. As an MP from Churu, he became the immediate successor of his father who was the MP of Churu for four terms.

He won the election as a Member of Lok Sabha again in 2019.

See also 

 Leader of the Bharatiya Janata Party in the Parliament of India

References

Living people
India MPs 2014–2019
People from Churu district
Lok Sabha members from Rajasthan
Bharatiya Janata Party politicians from Rajasthan
1977 births
India MPs 2019–present